Yasuhiro Wada may refer to:

 Yasuhiro Wada (Honda), Honda Racing F1 manager
 Yasuhiro Wada (video game designer), creator of the Story of Seasons video game series